Helena (minor planet designation: 101 Helena) is a large, rocky main-belt asteroid. It was discovered by Canadian-American astronomer J. C. Watson on August 15, 1868, and was named after Helen of Troy in Greek mythology.

This object is orbiting the Sun with a period of 4.16 years and an eccentricity of 0.14. Its orbital plane is inclined by 10.2° to the plane of the ecliptic. Radar observations were made of this object on Oct 7 and 19, 2001 from the Arecibo Observatory. Analysis of the data gave an estimated ellipsoidal diameter of 71×63×63 ± 16% km. The mean diameter estimated from IRAS infrared measurements is 66 km, in agreement with the radar findings. It is classified as an S-type asteroid in the Tholen system, suggesting a predominantly silicate composition. 101 Helena is spinning on its axis with a period of 23 hours.

References

External links 
 
 

000101
Discoveries by James Craig Watson
Named minor planets
000101
000101
18680815